The Prime Minister of Denmark is the head of government of the Kingdom of Denmark and leader of the Cabinet. The Prime Minister is formally appointed by the Monarch, who is head of state.

Since 1920, the title has been .

Denmark's current Prime Minister is Mette Frederiksen representing the social democratic party Social Democrats. Mette Frederiksen took office on 27 June 2019, taking over the position from Lars Løkke Rasmussen, representing the liberal party . Frederiksen is also the second female Prime Minister in the history of the country, after fellow socialist party colleague Helle Thorning-Schmidt who served from 2011 to 2015.

List of prime ministers (1848–1855)

List of Council Presidents (1855–1918)

List of prime ministers (1918–present)

Timeline (1848–present)
This is a graphical lifespan timeline of prime ministers of Denmark.  The prime ministers are listed in order of office, with prime ministers serving multiple premierships listed in order of their first.

<div style="overflow:auto">

See also
 Politics of Denmark
 List of Danish monarchs
 List of prime ministers of Finland
 List of heads of government of Norway
 List of prime ministers of Sweden

Notes

References

List of Danish heads of government from the Prime Ministers Office

Prime ministers
Denmark, List of prime ministers of
 
Prime ministers

id:Daftar Perdana Menteri Denmark
jv:Perdhana Mentri Denmark
pl:Premierzy Danii
zh:丹麦首相列表